Sengalipuram ("Shivakalipuram") is a village in Tamil Nadu, India.

Notable people from the village include Sengalipuram Muthanna, Anantharama Deekshithar and the Tamil writer "Thiru". It is one of the 18 Vathima villages.

Transport

The nearest airport is Trichy (150 km), and the nearest railway station is Kumbakonam (25 km).

Temples

Soleswarar Nistulaa ambika - Lord Shiva
 Valmiki ashram - Lord Ram; Annual Sriramanavami festival conducted during March End / Early April
 Dathathreya: It is believed by many devotees that after visiting Dathathreya the couples are blessed with a child 
 Ranganathar Swamy temple with six fingers in his leg.
 Kumara Koil - Lord Muruga
 Kasi viswanthar visalakhsi - Lord Siva

See also
Vathima

References

Villages in Tiruvarur district